The 2009–10 season was the 109th season in Athletic Bilbao's history and their 79th consecutive season in La Liga, the top division of Spanish football.

Squad statistics

Appearances and goals

|}

Competitions

La Liga

League table

Copa del Rey

Supercopa de España

UEFA Europa League

Group stage

Round of 32

External links

References

Athletic Bilbao
Athletic Bilbao seasons